Julie Lake is an American actress, best known for playing inmate Angie Rice on Orange is the New Black, for which she is a two-time winner of the Screen Actors Guild Award for Outstanding Performance by an Ensemble in a Comedy Series.

Early life and education
While Lake was in Grad School, she dated a fellow actor named Robert Stephan. A native of Palo Alto, California, Lake attended Yale University, where she majored in theater.

Career
Lake acted in theatrical plays in New York City for several years, including with Nick Jones. When Jones was hired to be a writer for Orange is the New Black, Jones suggested that Lake audition for the part of Angie Rice. Lake auditioned, and she got the part.

Lake and Shirin Najafi created a web series called George and Julie, which is about a struggling actress in Hollywood who seeks advice from her cat George who degrades her. Lake and Najafi also created a web series called Mental, which is about two friends and their anxiety and mental instability.

Personal life
Lake is married to Jeff Cahn and on 2019 she gave birth to a son. When she was asked to do a make-out scene on Orange Is the New Black, the producers asked her if she had someone in mind for the part, and her husband was brought in for the role.

Filmography

Film

Television

References

External links

American television actresses
Living people
Year of birth missing (living people)
Actresses from Palo Alto, California
Yale University alumni
21st-century American women